Luis Pardo Céspedes (20 June 1968, Barcelona, Spain), manager and writer, He is considered a specialist in leadership and new technologies as well as its application to small and medium enterprises. Since 2014, he has been CEO and executive vice president of Sage Iberia. In 2018, he received the Gold Medal for Merit at Work from the European Association of Economics and Competitiveness. He was recognized with the "CEO of the Year" award by the newspaper La Razón in 2017.

Professional development 
The family beginnings of Luis Pardo have marked the development of his career. Born into a family of small and medium entrepreneurs, he was able to learn about the problems faced by medium and small companies (SMEs) and he learned about the future solutions to them. His studies and his family experience allowed him to become one of the great Spanish experts in the application of new technologies and digitalization of small businesses. In addition, Luis Pardo is a loyal defender of diversity as an engine of innovation and he is an expert in managing multidisciplinary, multigenerational and multicultural teams.

Academic training 
He graduated summa cum laudem in business administration and management from the European University. Continuing his training with the Master in General Management from the IESE - Business School (University of Navarra), Master in Business Administration from EADA Business School (Barcelona) and a master's degree in business sciences, from the Management School (Barcelona).

Career 
He began his career in 1989, a year after finishing his degree, as a marketing manager in Copeca, a family business in the food sector that had begun its internationalization. Three years later, he moved to Gesfime where he worked in finance and sales.

After Gesfime, he moved into new technologies as the director of operations of a service company in the IT sector (Replitec). After this, he joined as director the third world manufacturer at that time, MPO, of digital media, CDs and DVDs, and worked with the leading companies in the world of software and multimedia. At the same time, MPO developed a new business with a logistics services company for the IT sector.

In 2001, he began his professional relationship with SAGE, the multinational world leader in business management software. After several positions of responsibility, he assumed the responsibility of the General Directorate of Clients in Europe and in 2014 he was appointed CEO in Spain, executive vice president of Sage Iberia and member of the European Committee in 2014.

Expert in medium and small companies 
As an expert in technological development in medium and small companies, he says that "the first lever of the growth of a company in the XXI century is innovation and in this case, technological innovation". In addition, he emphasizes the importance of continuing training and has applied this to his own professional career. Due to all this, it has become a benchmark in the world of SMEs and self-employed and has led him to collaborate as a guest firm in magazines and newspapers, such as [ El País Economía].

Due to his work at Sage Iberia, he has become a benchmark in the world of SMEs and self-employed. What is shown by its entry into various positions such as the Business Action Council of the CEOE, the Advisory Council of the Employer of Promotion of Work and its Network of Innovation and Technology. Is member of the Club Malaga Valley and he is President of the International Madrid Business Club. Since 2019 he is also a member of the board of trustees of the EADA University Foundation. Since 2020 he has been a member of the Management Committee and a member of the Board of Directors of AMETIC, the employers of the Technological Sector of Spain. Since May of that same year he has also been President of the British Chamber of Commerce in Spain, of whose Governing Council he previously formed part. Finally, he works as an advisor to new companies, which allows him to have a much wider perspective on the reality of the entrepreneurial ecosystem in Spain.

Expert in digital humanism 
Luis Pardo has been one of the first voices to speak of digital humanism in Spain and expresses his optimistic and fundamental vision about the effects of the Fourth Industrial Revolution in his book 'Journey to the center of digital humanism', convinced that with will and Ethics is our best ally to get better and more prosperous.

The technological revolution is rethinking the anthropological questions of classical masters and posing dilemmas and ethical challenges. Luis Céspedes defends that digital humanism is the answer to how we should use technology, and also to human values and to keep in mind that technology must always be at the service of the human being.

Bibliography 
 El ABC del autónomo. Guía práctica para planificar, financiar y gestionar tu propio negocio, Ed. Deusto (2016). 
 Siete claves para el éxito de las Start-Ups (edición digital)
Viaje al centro del humanismo digital, Ed. Verssus (2019).

Chapters of books 
 VV.AA: La empresa en España: Objetivo 2020, Ed. Deusto (2017).
 VV.AA: Internacionalización: claves y buenas prácticas, Profit (2015)
 VV.AA: Nuevas tendencias en gestión pública, Profit (2011)

Awards and honours

References 

Spanish writers
Living people
1968 births